Barack Obama Green Charter High School is a charter high school that serves students in ninth through twelfth grades in Plainfield, in Union County, New Jersey, United States, that focuses on education in the field of Sustainability and Leadership. The school operates on a charter granted by the New Jersey Department of Education. The charter for the school was approved in September 2009, as part of an announcement by Governor Jon Corzine of eight charter schools granted by the state in that cycle. After receiving approval from city's Board of Adjustment, the school opened in September 2010.

As of the 2021–22 school year, the school had an enrollment of 231 students and 23.0 classroom teachers (on an FTE basis), for a student–teacher ratio of 10.0:1. There were 121 students (52.4% of enrollment) eligible for free lunch and 17 (7.4% of students) eligible for reduced-cost lunch.

Athletics
The Barack Obama Green Charter High School Hornets play independently of any conference in play under the auspices of the New Jersey State Interscholastic Athletic Association (NJSIAA). With 192 students in grades 10-12, the school was classified by the NJSIAA for the 2019–20 school year as Group I for most athletic competition purposes, which included schools with an enrollment of 75 to 476 students in that grade range.

Administration
Core members of the school's administration are:
Erin Murphy-Richardson, Head of School / Principal
Joan Orimaco, School Business Administrator

References

External links 

Barack Obama Green Charter High School, National Center for Education Statistics
 

2010 establishments in New Jersey
Charter schools in New Jersey
Educational institutions established in 2010
Plainfield, New Jersey
Public high schools in Union County, New Jersey